Cade McNamara (born May 28, 2000) is an American football quarterback for the Iowa Hawkeyes. McNamara was the starting quarterback for the 2021 Michigan Wolverines team won the 2021 Big Ten championship, and appeared in the College Football Playoff, suffering a 34-11 loss to No. 3 Georgia in the 2021 Orange Bowl.

McNamara lost his starting QB spot with the Wolverines after week 2 of the 2022 season to J. J. McCarthy. McNamara then suffered a season ending injury in a week 3 game against UConn.

Following the conclusion of the 2022 regular season on November 28, McNamara entered the NCAA transfer portal and chose to transfer to the University of Iowa on December 1.

Early years and high school career
McNamara was born in 2000. His father, Gary McNamara, played baseball as the starting center fielder at Fresno State in 1992 and 1993 and worked as an assistant coach for the Nevada Wolf Pack baseball team.

With encouragement from his father, McNamara initially played baseball as an infielder and pitcher. After his freshman year of high school, he quit  baseball  to focus on football.

In 2015, McNamara enrolled at Damonte Ranch High School in Reno, Nevada, and became the school's starting quarterback as a freshman. In four years at Damonte, he set Nevada prep football records with 12,804 passing yards and 146 touchdown passes. He was the Gatorade Player of the Year for Nevada in both 2017 and 2018.

College career

Michigan
Rated as the No. 1 football prospect in Nevada, McNamara initially committed to play for Notre Dame. He rescinded his commitment in February 2018 and announced the following month that he had committed to play for Michigan. McNamara also had offers from Alabama, Georgia, and USC, and credited his choice of Michigan to its head coach Jim Harbaugh. He completed high school in December 2018, allowing him to enroll early at Michigan in January 2019.  

McNamara did not see game action during the 2019 football season.

On November 14, 2020, McNamara saw his first significant college football game action against Wisconsin. He entered the game in the third quarter with the Wolverines trailing, 35–3. On his first drive in the game, he threw a touchdown pass to Mike Sainristil and then threw for a two-point conversion.

On November 21, 2020, McNamara entered Michigan's game against Rutgers in the second quarter with Michigan trailing, 17–0. He led a comeback that ended with a triple-overtime victory by the score of 48 to 42. McNamara completed 27 of 36 passes for 260 yards and four touchdowns and also scored a rushing touchdown. The comeback from a 17-point deficit was the third largest in Michigan history. On November 28, McNamara made his first career start at quarterback, but battled injury, completing 12-of-25 passes for 91 yards in a 17–27 loss to Penn State.

McNamara started all 14 games for the Wolverines in 2021. His best performance came in what would be the team's only regular season loss. On October 30 at Michigan State, McNamara threw for 383 yards on 28-for-44 passing with two touchdowns and an interception in a 37-33 loss to the Spartans. On November 27, he was 13-for-19 with 159 yards and an interception in the Wolverines' 42-27 win over Ohio State, Michigan's first victory against its rival since 2011. The next week, in the Big Ten Championship Game, McNamara threw for 169 yards in a 42-3 blowout of Iowa, clinching the program’s first appearance in the College Football Playoff. 

Michigan's 2021 season ended at the Orange Bowl, a College Football Playoff semifinal, with a 34-11 loss to eventual national champion Georgia. Despite throwing just four interceptions all season up to that point, McNamara was picked off twice by Georgia and benched late in the game in favor of backup J.J. McCarthy.

On December 16, 2021, McNamara signed a deal with Brady Brand, an apparel company led by former Michigan quarterback Tom Brady.

Prior to the 2022 season, McNamara competed with J.J. McCarthy for the role as Michigan's starting quarterback. McNamara started in week one against Colorado State, going 9-for-18 with 136 yards and a touchdown. McCarthy was named the permanent starter after starring in week two against Hawaii.

McNamara appeared briefly in the Wolverines' games against Hawaii and UConn. In the week three contest with UConn, McNamara injured his right knee. On November 10, McNamara announced that he had undergone knee surgery and intended to play again. He finished the season 14-for-25 with 180 passing yards, a touchdown, and an interception.
 
After Michigan's regular season finale against Ohio State, McNamara entered the transfer portal.

Iowa Hawkeyes
On December 1, 2022, McNamara announced his commitment to the Iowa Hawkeyes. He will have two seasons of eligibility left.

College statistics

References

External links

 Michigan Wolverines bio

2000 births
Living people
American football quarterbacks
Iowa Hawkeyes football players
Michigan Wolverines football players
Players of American football from Nevada
Sportspeople from Reno, Nevada